The foreign employees in Meiji Japan, known in Japanese as O-yatoi Gaikokujin (Kyūjitai: , Shinjitai: , "hired foreigners"), were hired by the Japanese government  and municipalities for their specialized knowledge and skill to assist in the modernization of the Meiji period. The term came from Yatoi (a person hired temporarily, a day laborer), was politely applied for hired foreigner as O-yatoi gaikokujin.

The total number is over 2,000, probably reaches 3,000 (with thousands more in the private sector). Until 1899, more than 800 hired foreign experts continued to be employed by the government, and many others were employed privately. Their occupation varied, ranging from high salaried government advisors, college professors and instructor, to ordinary salaried technicians.

Along the process of the opening of the country, the Tokugawa Shogunate government first hired, German diplomat Philipp Franz von Siebold as diplomatic advisor, Dutch naval engineer Hendrik Hardes for Nagasaki Arsenal and Willem Johan Cornelis, Ridder Huijssen van Kattendijke for Nagasaki Naval Training Center, French naval engineer François Léonce Verny for Yokosuka Naval Arsenal, and British civil engineer Richard Henry Brunton. Most of the O-yatoi was appointed through government approval with two or three years contract, and took their responsibility properly in Japan, except some cases.

As the Public Works hired almost 40% of the total number of the O-yatois, the main goal in hiring the O-yatois was to obtain transfers of technology and advice on systems and cultural ways. Therefore, young Japanese officers gradually took over the post of the O-yatoi after they completed training and education at the Imperial College, Tokyo, the Imperial College of Engineering or studying abroad.

The O-yatois were highly paid; in 1874, they numbered 520 men, at which time their salaries came to ¥2.272 million, or 33.7 percent of the national annual budget. The salary system was equivalent to the British India, for instance, the chief engineer of the British India's Public Works was paid 2,500 Rs/month which was almost same as 1,000 Yen, salary of Thomas William Kinder, superintendent of the Osaka Mint in 1870.

Despite the value they provided in the modernization of Japan, the Japanese government did not consider it prudent for them to settle in Japan permanently. After the contract terminated, most of them returned to their country except some, like Josiah Conder and William Kinninmond Burton.

The system was officially terminated in 1899 when extraterritoriality came to an end in Japan. Nevertheless, similar employment of foreigners persists in Japan, particularly within the national education system and professional sports.

Notable O-yatoi gaikokujin

Agriculture
  William Smith Clark
  Edwin Dun
  Max Fesca
  Oskar Kellner
  Oskar Löw, agronomist
  William Penn Brooks, agronomist

Medical science
  Erwin von Bälz
  Johannes Ludwig Janson
  Heinrich Botho Scheube
  Julius Scriba

Law, administration, and economics
  Georges Appert, legal scholar
  Gustave Emile Boissonade, legal scholar
  Hermann Roesler, jurist and economist
  Georg Michaelis, jurist
  Albert Mosse, jurist
  Otfried Nippold, jurist
  Heinrich Waentig, economist and jurist
  Georges Hilaire Bousquet, legal scholar
  Horatio Nelson Lay, railway developer
  Alexander Allan Shand, monetary
  Henry Willard Denison, diplomat
  Karl Rathgen, economist

Military
  Jules Brunet, artillery officer
  Léonce Verny, constructor of the Yokosuka Naval Arsenal
  Klemens Wilhelm Jakob Meckel, Army instructor
  Carl Köppen, Army instructor
  James R. Wasson, Civil engineer and teacher, army engineer
  Douglas R. Cassel, Naval instructor
  Henry Walton Grinnell, Navy instructor
  José Luis Ceacero Inguanzo, Navy instructor
  Charles Dickinson West, naval architect
  Henry Spencer Palmer, military engineer
  Archibald Lucius Douglas, Naval instructor

Natural science and mathematics
  William Edward Ayrton, physicist
  Edward Divers, chemist
  Thomas Corwin Mendenhall, physicist
  Edward S. Morse, zoologist
  Charles Otis Whitman, zoologist, successor of Edward S. Morse
  Heinrich Edmund Naumann, geologist
  Curt Netto, metallurgist
  Sir James Alfred Ewing, physicist and engineer who founded Japanese seismology
  Cargill Gilston Knott, succeeding J.A. Ewing
  Benjamin Smith Lyman, mining engineer

Engineering
  William P. Brooks, agriculture
  Richard Henry Brunton, builder of lighthouses
   Charles Alfred Chastel de Boinville, architect
  Josiah Conder, architect
  William Kinnimond Burton, engineering, architecture, photography
  Horace Capron, agriculture, road construction
  Henry Dyer, engineering education
  Hermann Ende, architect
  François Perregaux, mechanical watchmaker
  Albert Favre Zanuti, mechanical watchmaker
  George Arnold Escher, civil engineer
  John G.H. Godfrey, geologist, mining engineer
  John Milne, geologist, seismologist
  Colin Alexander McVean, civil engineer
  Edmund Morel, civil engineer
  Johannis de Rijke, civil engineer, flood control, river projects
  John Alexander Low Waddell, bridge engineer
  Thomas James Waters, civil engineer
  William Gowland, mining engineer, archaeologist
  James Favre-Brandt, mechanical watchmaker
  Jean Francisque Coignet, mining engineer
  Henry Scharbau, cartographer
  Wilhelm Böckmann, architect
  Anthonie Rouwenhorst Mulder, civil engineer, rivers and ports

Art and music
  Edoardo Chiossone - engraver
  Luther Whiting Mason, musician
  Ernest Fenollosa, art critic
  Franz Eckert, musician
  Rudolf Dittrich, musician
  Antonio Fontanesi, oil painter
  Vincenzo Ragusa, sculptor
  John William Fenton, musician

Liberal arts, humanities and education
  Alice Mabel Bacon, pedagoge
  Basil Hall Chamberlain, Japanologist and Professor of Japanese
  James Summers, English literature
  Lafcadio Hearn, Japanologist
   Viktor Holtz, educator
  Raphael von Koeber, philosopher and musician
  Ludwig Riess, historian
  Leroy Lansing Janes, educator, missionary
  Marion McCarrell Scott, educator
  Edward Bramwell Clarke, educator
  David Murray, educator

Missionary activities
  William Elliot Griffis, clergyman, author
  Guido Verbeck, missionary, pedagoge
  Horace Wilson, missionary and teacher credited with introducing baseball to Japan

Others
  Francis Brinkley, journalist
  Ottmar von Mohl, court protocol

See also

 Foreign cemeteries in Japan
 Foreign relations of Japan
 France–Japan relations
 France–Japan relations (19th century)
 Germany–Japan relations
 Italy–Japan relations
 Japan–Portugal relations
 Japan–Netherlands relations
 Japan–United Kingdom relations
 Japan–United States relations
 Spain–Japan relations
 Meiji period
 Russians in Japan

References

External links

 Dentsu Advertising Museum/Meiji Era
 The first foreign trading firms in Japan
 The impact of the O-Yatoi Gaikokujin during the Meiji Era
 Tokyo University of Education 120th Anniversary Memorial Tokyo University Show  (in Japanese)

 
F
F